Ada and Eben are sceptres which represent symbols of authority in the ancient Benin Kingdom. Ada, which represent a `sword of honour` and Eben which represent a `sword for dancing` were introduced to the Benin Monarchy system during the Ogiso Ere dynasty. Both scepters are mainly used for authority proclamation and ceremonial activites. The Ogiso Ere dynasty introduced Ada and Eben around16 A.D. - 66 A.D. The Ada appears to be superior to the Eben as it is held by the Oba of Benin Kingdom. However, it can sometimes be delegated to any senior Chief in the Kingdom such as the Uzama (King Makers) and Enigies. Whereas, the Eben is often held by titled chiefs in Benin Kingdom.

See also 
List of the Ogiso
Kingdom of Benin
Oba of Benin

References 

Edo people
Formal insignia
Kingdom of Benin